Upper Main Street Historic District is a national historic district located at Lafayette, Tippecanoe County, Indiana. Sixth Street was the City of Lafayette's eastern boundary when it was originally platted.  By 1840, the boundary was extended to include Lake Erie and Wabash Railroad at Eleventh Street.  This area became the cities commercial center.  Businesses around Eleventh Street developed to meet the traveling publics needs.  The Enterprise Hotel, at 1015 Main Street, as well as the Alt Heidelberg, American Lafayette and the Derby Hotel were early established by 1899.

Significant structures
1873, Vollmer-Conrad Building, 1001 Main Street
1875, Enterprise Hotel, 1015 Main Street
1877, Beck Building, 731 Main Street
1877/1897, Carnahan Hall, 800 Main Street
1880/1919, Duplex, 612-614 Columbia Street
1884, Haderle Building, 1010 Main Street
1887, Krabbe Building, 1000-10`02 Main Street
1892-1893, Carnahan Building, 622 Main Street
1899, Weigle Townhouse, 932-925 Main Street
1915, D.L. Ross Building, 652-688 Main Street
1920-1921, Mars Theater, 111 North Sixth Street
1938, Lafayette Theater, 600 Main Street
All structures are historically ‘Notable’ or ‘Outstanding’ examples within the Historic District.  An ‘O’ rating signifies that the structure had enough historic or architectural significance to be considered for individual listing in the National Register of Historic Places.  The ‘N’ rating signifies that the structure is above average and may, with further investigation be eligible for an individual listing.  The contributing structures meet the basic inventory qualifications, but fails to meet individual merit, but in combination with other closely placed similar structures warrants inclusion in an historic district.

Gallery

See also 
 Centennial Neighborhood District 
 Downtown Lafayette Historic District
 Ellsworth Historic District
 Highland Park Neighborhood Historic District
 Jefferson Historic District
 Ninth Street Hill Historic District
 Perrin Historic District
 St. Mary Historic District

References

Italianate architecture in Indiana
Romanesque Revival architecture in Indiana
Neoclassical architecture in Indiana
Buildings and structures in Lafayette, Indiana
Historic districts on the National Register of Historic Places in Indiana
Historic districts in Lafayette, Indiana
National Register of Historic Places in Tippecanoe County, Indiana